Dioscorea strydomiana is a critically endangered species of yam from South Africa with fewer than 250 mature individuals known to exist.

Description
It has herbaceous stems from the upper part of the tuber each year, and then die back over the course of the dry season. Its ovate or elliptical leaves are found on short stalks and arranged alternately along the stems.

The fruits resemble dry capsules that split at the ends to release seeds.

It is a recently discovered species, an extremely slow growing plant, but it has great horticultural potential.

Name
The specific epithet honors the late Gerhard Strydom, a conservationist with the Mpumalanga Tourism and Parks Agency, who noticed the plant for sale at a market and tracked it down to its habitat.

Distribution

Uses
The plant is used in traditional medicine (like other Dioscorea species).

References

strydomiana
Endemic flora of South Africa
Critically endangered flora of Africa
Critically endangered plants